Bagdadia sapindivora is a moth in the family Gelechiidae. It was described by John Frederick Gates Clarke in 1958. It is found in Honshu, Japan.

The wingspan is 13–17 mm. The forewings are greyish fuscous, the scales tipped with cinereous. The extreme costa of the forewings is tawny olive and there are five raised tawny-olive scale tufts mixed with greyish fuscous and cinereous on the costa. There are also three tawny-olive blotches, the third of which with a spot of ground color in the center. The hindwings are fuscous, lighter basally.

The larvae feed on Sapindus mukurossi.

References

Moths described in 1929
Bagdadia